Dulhe Raja (transl. Groom King) is a 1998 Indian Hindi-language romantic comedy film starring Govinda, Raveena Tandon, Kader Khan, Johnny Lever, Prem Chopra and  Asrani.

Plot
K. K. Singhania a business tycoon buys an expensive hotel "Maharaja International" from P. K. Diwani. Later on, Singhania finds that a dhaba inside the hotel complex run by a petty guy Raja acts as a hitch to the earnings of the hotel. The hilarity starts henceforth when every ploy used by Singhania to dislodge Raja's dhaba ends up in smoke.

Singhania's daughter Kiran is in love with a man named Rahul. Rahul is financially aided by a confederate, Bishambar Nath. At the same time, Raja develops a fascination for Kiran. Raja, who is already a thorn in Singhania's side, proclaims his love for Kiran before Singhania. He persistently begs Singhania for Kiran's hand only to be refused by Singhania.

However, Singhania knows that Rahul is a rogue whose pursuit is to lure young women and later abandon them after exploiting their wealth. So he warns Kiran not to marry Rahul. After strife between Singhania and Kiran, the former says that Kiran is allowed to marry any man, be he a destitute or Singhania's enemy, without his refusal, except Rahul.

One day, Raja knocks down the top floor of Singhania's hotel after Singhania tries to demolish his dhaba using a municipality bulldozer. Enraged at this, Singhania vehemently declares Raja as his greatest enemy. Kiran overhears this and decides to thwart her father's decision that Kiran is allowed to marry any man, be he a destitute or Singhania's enemy, but Rahul. She starts a mendacious love affair with Raja, gaining the latter's affection.

Kiran's plan succeeds when Singhania objects to Raja. Raja thwarts Singhania at every juncture. Singhania decides to marry his daughter to the son of his friend and plans to announce their engagement at her birthday party. However, Raja gatecrashes the party and foils Singhania's plan.

The story takes a turn when Kiran dumps Raja and declares Rahul as her ultimate man. Raja warns her of Rahul's true intentions. He sides with Singhania and tries to convince of her father's reasons. Singhania changes his mind about Raja and announces that he would marry his daughter to him. Kiran departs for Rahul's home, and Rahul finds it a great opportunity to acquire Singhania's entire wealth as his daughter is now in his custody. He assaults Kiran, confines her in his home and demands Singhania by phone, of his entire wealth and property as a pay-off for his daughter's life.

Raja learns about Rahul's vicious plan and decides to rescue Kiran. He conspires with Singhania to dupe Bishambar of his wealth. He arrives at Rahul's house and hoodwinks him and his accomplices that they become hostile with one another. He beats up Rahul when Singhania arrives with some documents, apparently to transfer his entire wealth to Bishambar. Delighted at attaining Singhania's entire assets, Bishambar signs the papers without reading them but later finds that they are not the property papers as he expected, but his confession of kidnapping Kiran and threatening her life. The papers further state his desire for his clothes and other belongings to be seized by his men forcibly. His men snatch away his possessions when police arrive and arrest Rahul, Bishambar and their associates.

In the final scene, Singhania, Kiran, and Raja unite.

Cast
Govinda as Rajnath : Raja Owner of Dhaba Raja International 
Raveena Tandon as Kiran Singhania
Kader Khan as K.K. Singhania, Owner of Hotel Maharaja International 
Prem Chopra as Bishambar Nath
Mohnish Behl as Rahul Sinha
Johnny Lever as Baankey Lal Chaurasia 
Asrani as Inspector Azgar Singh
Dinesh Hingoo as Rukshar Diwani Seth
Viju Khote as Municipal Commissioner Todnar
Manmauji as Chhotu
Guddi Maruti as Azgar Singh's Wife
Sudhir as SSP Nissar Khan
Veeru Krishnan as Dance Master ji
Ghanashyam Rohera as Police Constable
Anjana Mumtaz as Mrs. Elizabeth Singhania, Kiran's mother
Rana Jung Bahadur as Pitambar Nath
Anil Nagrath as Sukhiram

Music
Songs of the film were scored by Anand–Milind who presented some remarkably striking numbers for the album. The frisky "Suno Sasurjee Ab Zidd Chhodo" became significantly popular, followed by "Ankhiyon Se Goli Maare", picturised on Govinda and Raveena Tandon, which is pretty identical to the perky romantic songs sought-after at that period, like "Ole Ole" (Yeh Dillagi) and "Husn Hai Suhaana" (Coolie No. 1). In the few years that followed 1998, the film was relayed on some Indian TV channels on which a snippet of the song "Ankhiyon Se Goli Maare" was shown as a trailer of the film. Other songs of the film are pleasant to the ears, but the aforesaid two went on to become the most popular songs of the album. Mention may be made that an instrumental version of the song "Ankhiyon Se Goli Maare" synchronizes the credit display at the beginning of the film. The lyrics were created by Sameer.

Soundtrack

Award

|-
| 1999
| Johnny Lever
| Filmfare Award for Best Performance in a Comic Role
| 
|}

Reception
One song from the movie, Kahan Raja Bhoj, Kahan Gangu Teli, provoked protests from a Nagpur-based organisation, the Vidarbha Teli Samaj Mahasangh, on the grounds that it offended the members of their community; they wrote a letter of  protest to then-Chief Minister Manohar Joshi, condemning the approval given by the state government to the song and calling for it to be banned. Another song, Ankhiyon Se Goli Maare, would later become the inspiration for a film of the same name by director Harmesh Maholtra, starring an almost identical cast.

It was the Seventh Highest Grossing Film of the year.

Trivia
1. During the 90s, the Govinda—director David Dhawan collaboration yielded many superhit comedy movies. Contrary to the customary notion, Dulhe Raja — an entirely comedy film released in 1998, was directed by Harmesh Malhotra, who had to his credit movies like Nagina (1986), Paappi Devataa (1995), Kismat (1995) etc.

2. Johnny Lever received the Filmfare Best Comedian Award in 1999 for the movie.

3. A song from the movie - "Ankhiyon Se Goli Maare", would later become the inspiration for a film of the same name by director Harmesh Maholtra.

4. The movie was remade in Kannada as Shukradeshe in 2001.

References

External links

1998 films
Indian comedy films
1990s Hindi-language films
Films scored by Anand–Milind
Hindi films remade in other languages
Films directed by Harmesh Malhotra
1998 comedy films
Hindi-language comedy films